Windsurfing is a wind propelled water sport that is a combination of sailing and surfing. It is also referred to as "sailboarding" and "boardsailing", and emerged in the late 1960s from the aerospace and surf culture of California. Windsurfing gained a popular following across Europe and North America by the late 1970s and had achieved significant global popularity by the 1980s. Windsurfing became an Olympic sport in 1984.

Newer variants include windfoiling, kiteboarding and wingfoiling. Hydrofoil fins under the board allow the boards to safely lift out of the water and fly silently and smoothly above the surface even in lighter winds.

Windsurfing is a recreational, family friendly sport, most popular at flat water locations around the world that offer safety and accessibility for beginner and intermediate participants. Technique and equipment have evolved over the years

Major competitive disciplines include slalom, wave and freestyle. Increasingly, "foiling"  is replacing traditional events and the IQfoil class is the new olympic windsurfing racing class for France in 2024.

History
Jim Drake invented and co-patented windsurfing in California between 1967 and 1970. Alternative concepts by European Peter Chilvers and American Newman Darby are recognized as earlier sailboards. Drake was educated and trained as an aeronautical engineer at Stanford University. He spent his early years surfing, sailing and skiing. He conceived windsurfing to combine the simplicity of skiing with the pleasures of sailing. Mr. Drake is known historically as "The Father of Windsurfing." Drake's patented invention was marketed and sold under the brand name "Windsurfer" for over 20 years by a company he cofounded with Hoyle Schweitzer called Windsurfing International.

Windsurfing's popularity saw explosive growth in the 1970s and 1980s. Initially in Europe, then in North America. The sport began to take off in popularity around 1972 and by the end of the 1970s it was the fastest growing sport in the world. Originally, all windsurfing boards were "long boards". This type of board went relatively slower through the water, but worked well in low wind conditions. Light air, long board windsurfing was enjoyed by a wide range of participants including families with young children.

During the 1980s a global community consisting of equipment designers, manufacturers, athletes, travel professionals and journalists worked together to propel windsurfing forward. Innovation allowed for the development of stiff, light weight planing short boards, foot straps, harnesses and more stable sails. Windsurfing shattered the world speed sailing record. Windsurfing's retail momentum eventually slowed with the arrival of newer action sports. By the 1990s closely related action sports such as mountain biking, snowboarding, stand up paddle boarding (SUP) and kite boarding all directly competed for popularity with windsurfing. Many windsurfing schools closed, or switched to teaching kite boarding and currently teach mostly wing foiling.

After some lean years in the 2000s, the sport has seen a steady revival through the explosion of foiling.

The inventors

Modern windsurfing, as a sport and recreational activity, did not emerge until the latter half of the 20th century. The earliest version of a sailboard design utilizing a freely articulating sail on top of a board was created in 1962 by American Newman Darby. Independently, engineer Jim Drake invented and co-patented the version we all know today and called it  Windsurfing- a new new concept in sailing.

Long before this modern moment, there were small scale sailing craft that have used wind as the driving force, many of them sourced to the Polynesians who have been riding the wind and waves for centuries. Early accounts suggest island peoples were undertaking day trips over oceans standing upright on a solid board with a vertical sail. In the early 19th century, people in logging communities around western Lake Michigan were purportedly fixing sails to logs as part of log float control and for recreation.

In 1948, 20-year-old Newman Darby was the first to conceive the idea of using a handheld sail and rig mounted on a universal joint so that he could control his small catamaran—the first rudderless sailboard ever built that allowed a person to steer by shifting his or her weight in order to tilt the sail fore and aft. Darby filed for a patent but lacked the funds to resubmit. However, he is widely recognized as its inventor as well as the first to conceive, design, and build a sailboard with a universal joint. In his own words, Darby experimented throughout much of the 1950s and 1960s and it was not until 1963 that an improved sailboard with a conventional stayed sloop rig sail arrangement made it more stable than the one built in 1948. S. Newman Darby created his first product for a wider market in 1964 that he called the "Darby sailboard" on the Susquehanna River, Pennsylvania, United States. While Darby's "sailboard" incorporated a pivoting rig, it was "square rigged" or "kite rigged" and was subject to the associated limitations. The sailboard was operated with the sailor's back to the lee side of a kite-shaped sail. Darby's article stated that "you can learn to master a type of maneuvering that's been dead since the age of the picturesque square riggers". He began selling his sailboards in 1964. The main focus of his company, Darby Industries, was to sell plans such that any school-age child could build one for under $50. Rather than building personal wealth, his focus was to introduce youth to the sport of sailing in even very shallow water. A promotional article by Darby was published in the August 1965 edition of Popular Science magazine. Darby died in 2016 reportedly feeling pleased with the recognition he received for having played a key role in the start of windsurfing.

Twelve-year-old Peter Chilvers is also cited for inventing a kind of sailboard in England in 1958.

One evening at a small house party in Santa Monica, California in 1966 Stanford educated Aeronautical engineer Jim Drake shared his idea of creating a sail powered surfboard with a neighborhood friend named Hoyle Schweitzer. Drake, together with fellow aeronautical engineer Fred Payne, had come up with the idea 4 years earlier and were still thinking through some of the engineering details and had not yet built a working prototype. Drake's interest in creating windsurfing was based on solving an engineering puzzle. His goal was to design a portable wind propelled personal water craft that was like waterskiing without a boat. He envisioned it being used by his whole family during their spare time, which was often spent waterskiing, sailing and surfing. His design challenge was creating a new type of lightweight portable sail craft, whereby the sailor stood upright on a large surfboard while holding directly onto a small sail. Originally he designed it to be propelled by a hand held kite wing rather than a sail, but soon decided a movable sail was more practical.

After learning of Drake's revolutionary sailing concept, Schweitzer became quite interested in its potential for profitability. He encouraged Drake to build a functional prototype for testing. From the outset, the two men were motivated by different forces. Drake agreed to allow Schweitzer to join him on a shared patent mainly because Schweitzer agreed to pay 100% of the application fees and legal costs as well as finance most of the prototype's construction materials. Drake and Schweitzer collaborated more as friends than business partners, as no formal business partnership was ever signed. Drake incorrectly assumed that because they were joined on the patent, they were automatically joined legally in business. As a team, Drake came up with the original concept, designed, hand built and tested the first windsurfers and can be wholly credited as the sports inventor. Schweitzer's role was different. He was not directly involved in the sport's original conception and played no substantive role in the engineering either - he was the business engine that fueled its early growth. Although both men's names appear on the patent, Schweitzer's role was more co-patent holder rather than co-inventor. He was the aggressive businessman who pushed Drake early on in the process to complete the design project, got it successfully patented and began marketing and selling it for profit. Drake can be well regarded as the sport's inventor, while Schweitzer can be regarded for his role in widely promoting the Windsurfer brand, creating a successful one design racing class and helping create the nascent windsurfing industry.

Years later, in 2002, when the Professional Windsurfing Association (PWA) inducted both Drake and Schweitzer into the Windsurfing Hall of Fame, they called Drake "The Father of Windsurfing" for his role as inventor and egalitarian figure head throughout his lifetime, and called Schweitzer "the man who brought windsurfing to the masses" based on his efforts to promote the Windsurfer brand's popularity. It was a brief but productive collaboration between a talented engineer and a motivated businessman that together created the modern sport of windsurfing. Drake has stated in various interviews that he recognizes Darby and Chilvers as early sailboard pioneers and sees himself as the sports "re-inventor".

Drake's first prototype, the Windsurfer name 

Drake is known historically as one of the world's top aeronautical engineers. He was also an expert craftsman in his spare time. He combined both skills to conceive and build the world's first windsurfer prototype. First, he carefully engineered a mathematical simulation of his concept based on the physics of windsurfing. He then crafted nearly all of the windsurfer prototype components by hand in his Santa Monica, California home garage in January 1967. He built the wishbone boom, daggerboard and mast foot from laminated strips of teak wood. He custom designed and built a wood press jig for shaping the curve into the wishbone boom. The universal joint was built by reconfiguring a commercially available sailboat swivel joint constructed from heavy duty marine stainless steel with additional teflon components. Drake engineered the custom sail, which was made from Dacron sail cloth and cut and sewn by sail maker Bob Broussard into a triangular Bermuda rig. The custom board Drake engineered required a greater amount of displacement volume for floatation than was found in a traditional surfboard so an extra large custom built foam blank was constructed by Gordon "Grubby" Clark of Clark foam and shaped by Jim Drake and Gary Seaman at the Con Surfboard factory in Santa Monica, California. A repurposed hollow fiberglass mast was taken from a small "Flipper" racing dingy rig.

To gather the needed materials, Drake carefully instructed Schweitzer what raw materials to purchase such as an extra large foam blank to build the board and a hollow fiberglass mast for the sail. Drake completed construction of the prototype in his own garage during his spare time within a few months. 
Drake's question came down to simple operation of how a standing person could control both the power of the sail as well as the direction of the craft without a rudder. Drake discovered that one's ability to rotate the sail's position relative to the board could allow control of both power and direction. Experimenting with a rotational design, he invented the concept for the universal joint. Drake completed his engineering concept with a wishbone boom, a daggerboard, mast, mast foot, triangular sail and fin. Interestingly, because Drake always envisioned in his mind the sailor standing on the board with the sail in their hands, he originally forgot to include a rope, now called an uphaul, which allows the sailor to pull the sail from the water. His first day on the water was made more difficult without this essential item, but by the second day he had invented that part as well.

On May 21, 1967, Jim Drake, along with his wife Wendy and daughter Stephanie, went to Marina del Rey's Jamaica Bay to make history with the world's first modern sailboard.

Click on link below to watch:

Jim Drake teaching himself how to windsurf on the first day.

Returning to Marina del Rey one week later, this time with the skeg and uphaul, Drake succeeded at sailing the board the way he designed it to be used. With his confidence buoyed from multiple days of practice in the protected bay, Drake next took his sailboard onto the open ocean at Will Rogers State Beach in Santa Monica, California. Drake subsequently taught Schweitzer how to windsurf and soon the sport was launched.

Originally Drake and Schweitzer wanted to name their new sailboard concept "Skate" (SK8), however changed the name to "Baja Board" in early 1968. Schweitzer was marketing a prototype of the Baja Board in Seattle, when Bert Salisbury stopped his car to have a look, and commented: "Gee I have the perfect name for it! Windsurfing!" The name was soon changed to Windsurfer, sold by the company Windsurfing International.

The details of Jim Drake's original windsurfing concept were published in 1969 by Drake's employer at the time, the RAND Corporation, in a technical paper written and presented by him titled Windsurfing - A New Concept in Sailing."  Further details can be read in published interviews. Despite forty years of subsequent development, the design is still remarkably similar to today's windsurfing equipment, and the word "windsurfer" has become synonymous with the sport itself.

The sport's first company
Jim Drake and Hoyle Schweitzer started the sport's first company, Windsurfing International, in late 1968 out of Drake's Santa Monica, California home. Both men were employed full time outside of their startup windsurfing business and so windsurfing was little more than an experimental hobby for them at that time. Drake and his wife Wendy, along with Schweitzer and his wife Diane worked closely together in their spare time to create a marketable framework for their new sport. Jim and Wendy created the business's name and iconic logo while Diane and Hoyle started a magazine and launched a one design racing class. Very soon afterward Drake was called away from his home in California during the height of the Cold War "to serve his country" 2000 miles away in Washington DC. Around this same time Schweitzer's computer programming career crashed.

While temporarily relocated to the East Coast, Drake led team of top level military specialists and aeronautical engineers at The Pentagon. He found himself tasked with creating a new global missile defense system and designing some of the world's first experimental rocket planes. While Drake was away for two years immersed in his top secret work on the other side of the country, Schweitzer seized upon the opportunity to produce windsurfers as his new career. He quickly worked to forge a profitable windsurfing business back on the West Coast without including his partner Drake. Once the co-patent was granted, Schweitzer quietly chose to unilaterally incorporate Windsurfing International and began collecting licensing fees for the production of over 100,000 boards in Europe without ever informing Drake. Schweitzer concealed from Drake the somewhat large profits he was beginning to make from selling the boards Drake had invented. Observers believe it was always Schweitzer's plan to keep Drake uniformed of the large profit potential long enough to misrepresent and under value the real worth of the patent so that Schweitzer could buy out Drake's half of the patent for as little as possible. When Drake discovered Schweitzer's unkind actions he was deeply confused and angered. Drake, who trusted him as a close family friend was shocked that Schweitzer would deceive him in this way. Drake somehow wanted to believe that Schweitzer and his family were still trusted friends and Drake was not interested in forfeiting his half of the patent. However Schweitzer and his attorneys would continue for 5 years to aggressively pressure Drake to sell his half of the patent to Windsurfing International in order to secure a lucrative monopoly on future royalties. 

By 1973, Drake, finding himself consumed with a high level aeronautical engineering career, raising six children, and having little time and energy to dedicate to broken friendships or the business of windsurfing, reluctantly sold his half of the patent to Windsurfing International in 1974 for the sum of $36,000 This allowed Schweitzer to continue building a profitable windsurfing empire for himself and for Drake to concentrate fully on family, and his work related to protecting the United States' national defense interests.

Windsurfing International,  registered the term "Windsurfer" as a trademark at the United States Patent and Trademark Office in 1973, launching the craft as a popular international one-design racing class. Going one-design was influenced by the desire to provide a fleet of racers with a uniformly constructed "boat" so that rider skill, rather than equipment choice, would determine competitive results. The Windsurfer one design class was based the success of the Laser and Hobie Cat classes. Each Windsurfer had an identical computer-cut sail, a technology new at that time and pioneered by Ian Bruce.

Patent Disputes
On March 27, 1968, Jim Drake, an aeronautical engineer, and Hoyle Schweitzer, a businessman  filed the very first windsurfing patent, which was granted by the USPTO in 1970.

Through the seventies, and early eighties windsurfing was the fastest growing sport on earth. Schweitzer aggressively protected his patent around the world through Sub-licensing the rights to anyone who wanted to manufacture and sell sailboards. Windsurfing International's usurious royalty fee charges, which its competitors were forced to pay, were so high that many observers felt it needlessly limited the growth of the sport. Mr. Schweitzer claimed this was to promote his brand and the Windsurfer One Design racing class, but most believed it was so he could maximize his own profits. The sport underwent very rapid growth however, particularly in Europe after the sale of a sub-license sold to Ten Cate Sports in the Netherlands. In 1975 Ten Cate Sports sold 45,000 boards in Europe.

At the same time, Schweitzer also sought to defend his patent rights vigorously against unauthorized manufacturers. This led to a host of predating windsurfer-like devices being presented to courts around the world by companies disputing Windsurfing International's rights to the invention.

In 1979, Schweitzer licensed Brittany, France-based company Dufour Wing, which was later merged with Tabur Marine – the precursor of Bic Sport. Europe was now the largest growing market for windsurfers, and the sub-licensed companies – Tabur, F2, Mistral – wanted to find a way to remove or reduce their royalty payments to Windsurfing International.

Tabur lawyers found prior art, in a local English newspaper which had published a story with a picture about Peter Chilvers, who as a young boy on Hayling Island on the south coast of England, assembled his first board combined with a sail, in 1958. This board used a universal joint, one of the key parts of the Windsurfing International's patent. They also found stories published about the 1948 invention of the sailboard by Newman Darby and his wife Naomi in Wilkes-Barre, Pennsylvania.

In Windsurfing International Inc. v Tabur Marine (GB) Ltd. 1985 RPC 59 with Tabur backed financially by French sailing fan Baron Marcel Bich, British courts recognized the prior art of Peter Chilvers. It did not incorporate the curved wishbone booms of the modern windsurfer, but rather a "straight boom" that became curved in use. The courts found that the Schweitzer windsurfer boom was "merely an obvious extension". This court case set a precedent for patent law in the United Kingdom, in terms of inventive step and non-obviousness; the court upheld the defendant's claim that the Schweitzer patent was invalid, based on film footage of Chilvers. Schweitzer then sued the company in Canada, where the opposition team again financially backed by Bic included Chilvers and Jim Drake, and Schweitzer lost again. After the cases, no longer obliged to pay Windsurfing International any royalty payments, the now renamed Bic Sport became one of the world's larger producers of windsurfing equipment, with an annual production of 15,000 boards.

There is no evidence that Schweitzer or Drake had knowledge of any prior inventions similar to theirs. Drake accepted in retrospect that, although he can be credited with the invention, he was "probably no better than third," behind mid-west based Newman Darby and Englishman Peter Chilvers. The battle over the origin story of the sport would go on to cause much legal grief for the global sporting phenomenon for much of the 1980s.

In 1983, Schweitzer sued. Swiss board manufacturer Mistral and lost. Mistral's defense hinged on the work of US inventor Newman Darby, who by 1965 conceived the "sailboard": a hand-held square rigged "kite" sail on a floating platform for recreational use.

Eventually US courts recognized the Schweitzer windsurfer as an obvious step from Darby's prior art. Schweitzer had to reapply for a patent under severely limited terms, and finally it expired in 1987. Shortly thereafter, having lost its license royalty income, Windsurfing International ceased operations.

In 1984, Australian courts determined a patent case: Windsurfing International Inc & Anor v Petit & Anor (also part reported in 3 IPR 449 or [1984] 2 NSWLR 196), which attributed the first legally accepted use of a split boom to an Australian boy, Richard Eastaugh. Between the ages of ten and thirteen, from 1946 to 1949, aided by his younger brothers, he built around 20 galvanized iron canoes and hill trolleys which he equipped with sails with split bamboo booms. He sailed these in a sitting position and not as a windsurfer standing up, near his home on the Swan River in Perth. The judge noted that, "Mr Eastaugh greatly exaggerated the capacity of his galvanised iron canoes to sail to windward" and that, "There is no corroboration of Mr Eastaugh's experiences by any other witness. Neither of his brothers or his father was called".

It is acknowledged in the courts that the separate Eastaugh (1946–1949), Darby (1965) and Chilvers (1958) inventions pre-dated the Schweitzer/Drake patent (1968).

By the late 1980s the sport was massive and in the midst of a full-blown marketing and legal battle between the original market in the US, and the exploding European markets. This epic legal battle laid the ground for a still running rivalry between the European and American hemispheres.

Trademarks 
Windsurfing International briefly claimed trademark rights with respect to the word "windsurfer". While this was registered in the United States for some years, it was not accepted for registration in many jurisdictions as the word was considered too descriptive. Registration was ultimately lost in the United States for the same reason. Eventually the sport became known widely as either sailboarding or windsurfing.

Equipment
Windsurfers are often classified as either shortboards or longboards. Longboards are usually longer than 3 meters, with a retractable daggerboard, and are optimized for lighter winds or course racing. Shortboards are less than 3 meters long and are designed for planing conditions.

While windsurfing is possible under a wide range of wind conditions, most intermediate and advanced recreational windsurfers prefer to sail in conditions that allow for consistent planing with multi-purpose, not overly specialized, free-ride equipment. Larger (100 to 140 liters) free-ride boards are capable of planing at wind speeds as low as  if rigged with an adequate, well-tuned sail in the six to eight square meter range.

Modern windsurfing boards can be classified into many categories: The original Windsurfer board had a body made out of polyethylene filled with PVC foam. Later, hollow glass-reinforced epoxy designs were used. Most boards produced today have an expanded polystyrene foam core reinforced with a composite sandwich shell, that can include carbon fiber, kevlar, or fiberglass in a matrix of epoxy and sometimes plywood and thermoplastics. Racing and wave boards are usually very light (5 to 7 kg), and are made out of carbon sandwich. Such boards are very stiff, and veneer is sometimes used to make them more shock-resistant. Boards aimed at the beginners are heavier (8 to 15 kg) and more robust, containing more fiberglass.
Beginner boards: (Sometimes called funboards) these often have a daggerboard, are almost as wide as Formula boards, and have plenty of volume, hence stability.
Freeride: Boards meant for comfortable recreational cruising (mostly straight-line sailing and occasional turning) at planing speed (aka blasting), mainly in flat waters or in light to moderate swell. They typically fall into the volume range of 90 to 170 liters. The so-called freeride sailing movement diverged from course racing as more recreational sailors chose to sail freely without being constrained to sailing on courses around buoys.
Racing longboards: Internationally recognised One Design Classes such as the WINDSURFER Class, Mistral One Design, or the old Olympic RS:X class race boards, and the new 2024 Olympic Class iQFoil.
Formula Windsurfing Class: Shorter boards up to one meter in width, for use in Formula Windsurfing races. See below for a more detailed description.
Slalom boards: In the past, the key feature of slalom boards was merely speed, but it has been proven that maneuverability and ease of use are as important as speed in order to get you around the slalom course faster, and therefore modern slalom boards are shortboards aimed at top speed, maneuverability and ease of use. 
Speed boards: In essence an extremely narrow and sleek slalom board, built for top speed only.
Freestyle boards: Related to wave boards in terms of maneuverability, these are wider, higher volume boards geared specifically at performing acrobatic tricks (jumps, rotations, slides, flips and loops) on flat water. Usually 80 to 110 liters in volume, and about 203 to 230 centimeters in length, with widths frequently in excess of 60 centimeters. Freestyle boards began to diverge more noticeably in design from wave boards in the early part of the 2000 decade, as aerial tricks (the Vulcan, Spock, Grubby, Flaka, and related New School maneuvers, almost all involving a jump-and-spin component) became the predominant part of the freestyle repertoire, superseding Old School moves, in which the board did not leave contact with the water.
Wave boards: Smaller, lighter, more maneuverable boards for use in breaking waves. Characteristically, sailors on wave boards perform high jumps while sailing against waves, and they ride the face of a wave performing narrow linked turns (bottom turns, cutbacks, and top-turns) in a similar way to surfing. Wave boards usually have a volume between 65 and 105 liters, with a length between 215 and 235 centimeters, and 50 to 60 centimeters in width. A general rule is for a sailor to use a wave board whose volume in liters is about the same as the sailor's weight in kilograms – more volume providing additional flotation for sailing in light winds, and less for high winds, where less volume is needed to achieve planing. In recent years, the average width of wave boards has increased slightly, as the length has shrunk, while the range of volume has been maintained the same more or less—according to board designers this makes wave boards easier to use under a wider range of conditions by sailors of differing abilities. The most common sizes of sails used with wave boards are in the range of 3.4 to 6.0 square meters, depending on the wind speed and the weight of the sailor.

Sails

Modern windsurfing sails are often made of monofilm (clear polyester film), dacron (woven polyester) and mylar. Areas under high load may be reinforced with kevlar.

Two designs of a sail are predominant: camber induced and rotational. Cambered sails have 1–5 camber inducers - plastic devices at the ends of battens which cup against the mast. They help create a rigid aerofoil shape for faster speed and stability, but at the cost of maneuverability and how light the sail feels. The trend is that racier sails have camber inducers while wave sails and most recreational sails do not. The rigidity of the sail is also determined by a number of battens.

Beginners' sails often do not have battens, so they are lighter and easier to use in light winds. However, as the sailor improves, a battened sail will provide greater stability in stronger winds.

Rotational sails have battens which protrude beyond the back aspect of the mast. They flip or "rotate" to the other side of the mast when tacking or jibing, hence the rotation in the name. Rotational sails have an aerofoil shape on the leeward side when powered, but are nearly flat when sheeted out (unpowered). In comparison with cambered sails, rotational designs offer less power and stability when sailing straight, but are easier to handle when maneuvering. Rotational sails are usually lighter and easier to rig.

A windsurfing sail is tensioned at two points: at the tack (by downhaul), and at the clew (by outhaul). There is a set of pulleys for downhauling at the tack, and a grommet at the clew. Most shape is given to the sail by applying a very strong downhaul, which by design bends the mast. The outhaul tension is relatively weak, mostly providing leverage for controlling the sail's angle of attack.

The sail is tuned by adjusting the downhaul and the outhaul tension. Generally, a sail is trimmed more (flatter shape) for stronger winds. More downhaul tension loosens the upper part of the leech, allowing the top of the sail to twist and "spill" wind during gusts, shifting the center of effort (strictly, the center of pressure) down. Releasing downhaul tension shifts the center of effort up. More outhaul lowers the camber/draft, making the sail flatter and easier to control, but less powerful; less outhaul results in more draft, providing more low-end power, but usually limiting speed by increasing aerodynamic resistance.

The disciplines of windsurfing (wave, freestyle, freeride) require different sails. Wave sails are reinforced to survive the surf, and are nearly flat when depowered to allow riding waves. Freestyle sails are also flat when depowered, and have high low-end power to allow quick acceleration. Freeride sails are all-rounders that are comfortable to use and are meant for recreational windsurfing. Race sails provide speed at the expense of qualities like comfort or maneuverability.

The size of the sail is measured in square meters and can be from 3 m2 to 5.5 m2 for wave sails and 6 m2 to 15 m2 for race sails, with ranges for freestyle and freeride sails spanning somewhere between these extremes. Learning sails for children can be as small as 0.7 m2 and race sails up to 15 m2.

Associated Equipment
Mast
Boom
Fin (similar shape to a surfboard fin but is usually stronger for windsurfing)
Universal joint (elastic joints are more common, but some are mechanical)
Harness and Harness lines
Wet suit/dry suit
Footwear
Helmet
Personal flotation device
Travel gear – sail bags, board bags, car racks
Safety gear: line, distress strobe light, whistle, marine VHF radio

Technique
A sailboard is powered and controlled by the coordinated movements of the sail about its uni-joint and of the sailor around the board.  This is achieved by balancing the weight of the sailor against the wind pressure in the sail, while adjusting both factors relative to the board. Learning this involves the development of reflexes and "muscle memory" similar to the process of learning to ride a bicycle. These skills are typically and optimally done on large, buoyant boards in light winds on flat water.  Depending on wind conditions and the skill or intentions of the rider, at some point the sailboard will begin planing, resulting in a rapid increase in speed.  This higher speed requires the learning of new skills as the apparent wind changes and the board becomes steerable like a surfboard.

Learning and Skill Progression
Learning is a strenuous activity with many falls into the water, climbs back onto the board and repeating.  The time taken to reach the point of significant enjoyment varies greatly.

Youth
Windsurfing is suitable for children as young as 5, with several board and sail brands producing "Kids Rigs" to accommodate these short and light weight windsurfers.  In some countries, organisations exist to provide entry into the sport in a semi-formal or club-style environment (i.e. The RYA's Team 15 scheme). Robert (Robby) Naish took up the fledgling sport of windsurfing at the age of 11, and in 1976 won his first overall World Championship title at the age of 13.

Light winds
The board moves through the water – much like a sailing boat does – using an extendable centreboard (if available) and fin or skeg for stability and lateral resistance. The centreboard is retracted at broad points of sail, again similarly to a sailing boat, to allow for jibing control. In these conditions windsurf boards also tack and jibe like a sailing boat.

Directional control is achieved by moving the rig either forward (turning away from the wind) or aft (turning towards the wind). When jibing, the clew of the sail is let around and allowed to rotate out and around the mast.

Fall recovery: The rider climbs onto the board, grabs the pulling rope (uphaul), makes sure the mast foot is placed between his/her two feet, pulls the sail about one third out of the water, lets the wind turn the sail-board combination until he/she has the wind right in the back, pulls the sail all the way out, places the "mast hand" (hand closest to the mast) on the boom, pulls the mast over the center line of the board, places the "sail hand" (hand furthest from the mast) on the boom, then pulling on it to close the sail and power it.

Strong winds

In planing conditions a harness is typically worn to more efficiently use the rider's weight to counter the force in the sail. As the wind increases, the rider continues to sheet the sail, the fin generates more lift, and the board gains speed, transitioning onto a plane. The volume of board in the water (displacement) decreases, and the rider moves rearward, stepping into the footstraps for improved control. When planing, the board skims on the surface rather than displacing water as it moves. Planing can be achieved at different wind speeds depending on the rider's weight, sail and fin size, wave conditions, and rider ability. The transition from displacement motion to planing requires a jump in energy, but once planing, water resistance decreases dramatically. This means that it is possible to continue to plane, although the wind has dropped below a level that would be required to transition to plane. A board in plane can be much smaller than a board moving by displacement (thereby gaining an advantage in gear weight and board control). Lateral resistance to the wind is provided by the fin alone (generating more lift at higher speeds) and a centreboard is no longer used (smaller boards do not have one). A fin generates lift, transferring a strong load to the board, and so is usually constructed of carbon fiber for accurate shape and strength. A low-pressure area develops on the windward side of the fin, which can lead to cavitation, leading to a sudden loss of lift, called "spin-out" (equivalent to "stalling" in flight terminology). Planing is considered one of the most exhilarating aspects of the sport.

Steering is mainly achieved by changing the center of lateral resistance located along the daggerboard or fin through rotating the sail either fore and aft. Unlike fixed mast sail a boat, windsurfing is rudderless and uses the universal joint to allow steering the board with the sail alone. Jibing is done at full speed (a so-called "carve jibe", "power jibe" or "planing jibe"), whereby the rider turns downwind by leaning the sail forward, sheeting and applying pressure to the inside rail. Leaning into the turn much like a snowboarder making a toe-side turn. Pressure is released from the sail as the board turns downwind, allowing for the sail to be jibed. Tacking is turning around going upwind, and at higher speed has become an advanced maneuver, requiring quick movements and good balance. A heel-side turn while planing (called a "cut-back") is usually only executed in wave riding.

Water-start: In strong winds it is difficult to uphaul the sail (pulling it out of the water while standing on the board) so waterstarting is necessary. This is done (while water treading) by positioning the mast perpendicular to the wind, lifting the luff out of the water to allow the wind to catch the sail, and then having the sail pull the sailor onto the board. As the sail becomes powered, it is then trimmed to bring the rider, board, and sail back onto a plane. Occasionally a rider may be unable to waterstart if the wind has dropped. If this happens the rider can wait for a gust and "pump" the sail to get back on the board. If this becomes hopeless uphauling the sail will be necessary.

Racers

Long-board classes

Olympic class

Windsurfing has been one of the Olympic sailing events at the Summer Olympics since 1984 for men and 1992 for women. Olympic Windsurfing uses 'One Design' boards, with all sailors using the same boards, daggerboards, fins and sails. The equipment is chosen to allow racing in a wide range of sailing conditions The former Olympic class, the Neil Pryde RS:X was used for the first time in the 2008 Summer Olympics. For 2024 the new Olympic Class windsurfer will use advanced foil technology with the radical new iQFoil one design class.

One Design Racing classes
These offer hugely popular class racing around the world thanks to relative low cost, the same gear is competitive for many years with no class changes, added fun of competition that allows intermediates to race on the same gear as the best athletes and thus these are the most social of all racing classes. The most popular one design classes are the original WINDSURFER class, the long running Mistral One Design, the Youth development class Bic-Techno and the rapidly expanding new iQFoil.

Formula class

Formula windsurfing has developed over the last 15 years in order to facilitate high-performance competition in light and moderate winds. Formula is now a class of windsurfing boards controlled by World Sailing that has the principal characteristic of a maximum 1m width. They have a single fin of maximum length 70 cm and carry sails up to 12.5 m2. Class rules allow sailors to choose boards produced by multiple manufacturers, as long as they are certified as Formula boards and registered with ISAF, and use fins and sails of different sizes. With the sail, fin and board choices, the equipment is able to be tailored to suit sailors of all body shapes and formula windsurfing presents one of the fastest course-racing sailing craft on the water. Formula Windsurfing is popular in many locations around the globe with predominantly light winds and flat water.

Large sails in combination with the 'wide-style' design allow planing in very low wind conditions as well as control and usability in high winds and bigger sea conditions. Non-planing sailing is very difficult with this design and racing is only conducted with a strict  wind minimum in place. Formula boards are used on "flat water" as opposed to coastal surf, but racing is still held in windy conditions involving swell and chop. In 2008, a Formula Windsurfing Grand-Prix World Tour began, with events in Europe and South America complementing the single-event World Championships as a professional tour for the Formula class.

Formula boards have excellent upwind and downwind ability, but are not as comfortable on a beam reach unless fin sizes are reduced. This explains why the course is usually a box with longer upwind and downwind legs, or just a simple upwind-downwind return course.

Raceboard class
Raceboards are longer windsurf boards with a daggerboard and movable mast rail allowing the sailor to be efficient on all points of sail. Excellent upwind ability is combined with good reaching and even downwind ability typically sailed in an Olympic triangle course. Whilst in decline in manufacture since the advent of shortboard course racing (which evolved into Formula) there remains some models in production and most notably the IMCO One Design remains popular amongst amateur racing clubs.

Short-board classes

Slalom
Slalom is a high-speed race. Typically there are two sorts of slalom courses.
Figure of eight: All of the course should on a beam reach with two floating marks that have to be jibed around.
Downwind: More than two marks are laid and sailors sail a downwind course – jibing around each mark only once.
Slalom boards are small and narrow, and require high winds.

Ocean Slalom Marathon
There are 3 major Ocean Slalom Marathons in the world: The Defi-Wind in France, The Lancelin Ocean Classic in Western Australia, and the Hatteras Marathon in the USA.

Super X
This discipline is a cross between freestyle and slalom. Competitors race on a short downwind slalom course, must duck jibe on all turns, and are required to perform several tricks along the way. Competitors are required to wear protective equipment. The Super X discipline was short lived and is now largely unpracticed; it reached its peak in the early 2000s,

Speedsailing
Speedsailing takes place in several forms. The International Speed Windsurfing Class (ISWC) organizes (under the umbrella of World Sailing) competitions in various locations around the world known for conditions suitable for good speeds. The events are made up of heats sailed on a 500m course. The average of each sailor's best 2 speeds on the 500m course, which is typically open for 2 hours per heat, is their speed for that heat. As such it is possible for the sailor with the outright fastest time not to win the heat if his second best time pulls his average down. Points are given for the placings in the heats and the overall event winner is the sailor with the best point score (again not necessarily the fastest sailor). Likewise points are given for places in the events and at the last event a World Speedsurfing Champion is crowned.

On record attempts controlled by the World Sailing Speed Record Council (WSSRC) competitors complete timed runs on a 500m or 1 nautical mile (1,852m) course. The current 500m record (for Windsurfers) is held by French windsurfer Antoine Albeau. The women's 500m Record is held By Zara Davis, from England, also in Luderitz. The Men's nautical mile record is held by Bjorn Dunkerbeck and the women's mile record is held by Zara Davis both set in Walvis Bay, Namibia

With the advent of cheap and small GPS units and the website www.gps-speedsurfing.com, Speedsurfers have been able to organise impromptu competitions amongst themselves as well as more formal competitions such as the European Speed Meetings and Speedweeks/fortnights in Australia. With over 5000 sailors registered it is possible for windsurfers all over the world to compare speeds.

Indoor

"In 1990 indoor windsurfing was born with the Palais Omnisports de Paris – Bercy making its spectacular debut. It was during this first indoor event that Britain's Nik Baker, from the south coast, flourished and went on to add a whopping x6 Indoor World Championships to his name".

Indoor windsurfing competitions are held, especially in Europe, during winter. Powerful fans lined up along the side of a large pool, propel the windsurfers. Indoor competition disciplines include slalom style races and ramp jumping competitions. It is extremely dangerous because the pool is barely one meter deep and is surrounded by concrete.

World Champion Jessica Crisp has had arguably the worst injury in the history of the indoor events when, during a warm up session jumping the ramp, she snapped her leg and had to have emergency surgery in a French hospital. This was at the height of her professional career and fame across Europe.

The most famous indoor champions include Robert Teriitehau, Jessica Crisp, Robby Naish, Nick Baker, Eric Thieme, and Nathalie LeLievre.

Riders

Wavesailing
Wave sailing took off during the rapid development of windsurfing on the Hawaiian islands of Oahu and Maui.  It can be seen as comprising two distinct (but related) parts, wave riding and wave jumping.

A typical wave contest will score two jumps going out and two wave rides coming in. A high scoring heat would consist of a double clean forward rotating jump, a high one foot backward rotating jump, a long wave ride with flowing bottom turns, radical top turns, a series of aerials and a 360 aerial manoeuvre on the face of the waves such as a 'goiter', 'taka', wave 360, planing forward or clean flowing back-loop. Depending on the conditions at the location, some competitions will focus more on jumping while others focus more on the wave-riding aspects.

The most famous wave riding locations on earth include: Ho'okipa on the north shore of Maui, Diamond Head on Oahu, Klitmøller in Denmark, Pozo and Tenerife in the Canary Islands, Cabo Verde off the north west coast of Africa, Moulay in Morocco, Margaret River in Western Australia, Pacasmayo in Peru, Topocalma in Chile, and Omaezaki in Japan.

The World Cup Wavesailing competitions crown the professional world champions each year. One of the most prestigious events in the windsurfing world is called The Aloha Classic at Ho'okipa Beach on the north shore of Maui, Hawaii.

The Aloha Classic held at Ho'okipa Beach Park on the north shore of Maui, takes place each year in late October and early November for the best wind and wave conditions and it is common to have 15–20 foot wave faces during the contest. Since 2011 the event has been run by the International Windsurfing Tour (IWT)[3] as the Grand Final of the IWT Wave Tour. The IWT is the Hawaiian-based organisation for the wave riders of the Asia Pacific hemisphere. The Aloha Classic has often been the final event of the Professional Windsurfers Association (PWA)[4] crowning the PWA Wave World Champions.

Wave riding
Wave riding is a form of surfing with the extra speed and power afforded by the sail. It is strongly connected to its roots in surfing in style and culture. It involves the rider performing a series of bottom turns, top turns, and cutbacks whilst riding an unbroken wave back to the shore.  Top wave sailors are able to incorporate aerial moves into their wave riding and will use overhanging wave lips to launch themselves out in front of the wave in spectacular giant aerials.

Wave jumping
Wave jumping involves stunts of varying levels of difficulty which are performed after the rider has jumped from the peak of an unbroken wave. These are commonly referred to as aerial moves and include both forward rotation and backward rotations. The rider and his equipment rotate, doing single & double rotations and jumps where the sailor contorts his or her body and equipment. Recent innovations have included combining moves whilst airborne and, for the first time in 2008, one professional sailor, Ricardo Campello, has made attempts at a triple forward loop during a 2008 PWA competition.

Big wave riding 
At the most extreme end of the sport is big wave riding which means riders on waves faces over 30 feet high. The most popular place for this is on the north shore of Maui at place called Pe'ahi to the local Hawaiians, and known as JAWS to the rest of the world. The biggest waves here can be up to 60 foot faces. It breaks only in the winter months from late October to March. Other famous big wave locations include Nazaré in Portugal. Famous contemporary big wave riders include Kai Lenny, Marcilio Browne, Robby Swift, Sarah Hauser, Jason Polakow, and Robby Naish. The inaugural Big Wave Challenge annojunced the first ever winners in this category on April 10, 2020.

Storm riding
The most famous storm riding event is known as The Red Bull Storm Chase. It occurs only when there is a massive storm forecast with winds over 60 knots and giant waves over 20 feet. It is an invitational event and is extremely dangerous. The most recent winner was West Australian Jaeger Stone.

Freestyle

Freestyle is a timed event which is judged. The competitor who has the greatest repertoire, or manages to complete most stunts, wins. Freestyle is about show and competitors are judged on their creativity. Both the difficulty and the number of tricks make up the final score. Sailors who perform tricks on both tacks (port and starboard), and perform the tricks fully planing score higher marks. High scoring moves include Shifty (Shaka Pushloop), Double Air-Culo, Air-Kabikuchi, Air-Skopu and double Power-Moves, for example Air-Funnel Burner and Double Culo. The latest freestyle windsurfing is well documented and gets constantly updated on Continentseven. For novice windsurfers, low-wind freestyle tricks are an appropriate start, such as sailing backwards with the fin out of the water, or transitioning from a sailing stance to sitting on the board while continuing to sail.

Big air
Competitors compete to see who can record the highest jump or maneuver. A 3D accelerometer is worn to measure and record heights of the jumps. Xensr is a manufacturer of 3D accelerometers and promoter of the Big Air competition. It is a popular discipline on the Columbia River near the town of Hood River, Oregon, USA.

International stars

Top men
 Robby Naish (USA): one of the first windsurfing champions to gain international fame, he dominated the early years of competition in the 1970s and 1980s. World Champion from 1976 to 1979, Overall World Champion from 1983 to 1987, and Wave World Champion in 1988, 1989, and 1991. IWT BIG WAVE All-Time BIGGEST WAVE RIDER Champion 2020 (photo)
 Björn Dunkerbeck (ESP): the successor to Naish, he dominated international professional competition from the late 1980s and throughout the 1990s. Twelve-time PWA Overall World Champion in a row. He won the Professional Windsurfers Association (PWA) World Championships for Slalom, Wave, Course Racing and Overall, a record forty one times in total. He is credited in the Guinness Book of World Records as the most successful athlete of all time with 42 World Titles.
 Antoine Albeau (FRA): 22 times World Champion in various disciplines: Formula windsurfing, Super X, Freestyle, Slalom, Race, Speed, Overall. Holder of the windsurf speed record 53.27 knots, on the 5th of November 2015.
 Stephan van den Berg (NED), World Champion 1979–1983, gold medal winner first Olympic windsurfing contest in Los Angeles, California in 1984.
Anders Bringdal (SWE). Division 2 Heavyweight Champion 1984, Funboard World Champion 1985, Professional windsurfer PBA/PWA 1985 at Sylt. PBA Slalom Champion 1987, PBA Courseracing Champion 1988, Speed World Cup Champion 2009. First man over 50 knots in official timing over 500 metres in Lüderitz 2012.
 Arnaud de Rosnay (FRA): Photographer, and windsurfing adventurer. Best known for his open-ocean windsurfing exploits, and numerous long distance crossings in conflict areas. Lost at sea in November 1984 in the Taiwan Strait.  He created the first speedsailing event in 1981, a 40 km race in Maui.  80 competitors participated in the first event, Arnaud de Rosnay finishing second behind Robby Naish. He is also credited with the invention of Kite surfing (1980) and land sailing (Speedsail 1977), even crossing a distance of 1380 km in the Sahara in 1979.
 Christian Marty (FRA): Airline pilot for Air France. He was the first person to windsurf across the Atlantic Ocean in 1981, from Dakar, Senegal to Kourou, French Guiana. He was later captain of Air France Flight 4590 which crashed after takeoff killing everyone on board and several more people on the ground.
 Peter Boyd (USA): Moved to Maui in 1980, and pioneered several windsurfing maneuvers. He was the first to perform an aerial loop, which was considered impossible by many. The maneuver opened the door to a variety of aerial loop variations, including the push loop and double rotations. While innovation was his main focus, Boyd did defeat World champion, Ken Winner several times at International competitions.
 Guy Cribb (GBR): four times world championships runner-up in the 1990s. 13 UK champion titles.
 Mark Angulo (USA): Early pioneer of many wave sailing moves, including the wave-face 360.
 Jason Polakow (AUS): PWA Wave World Champion, 1997, 1998. First windsurfer to ride big wave of Nazare, in Portugal.
 Kevin Pritchard (USA): PWA Overall World Champion, 2000. PWA Wave World Champion, 2006. Aloha Classic Wave Champion 2016.
 Nik Baker (GBR): Three-time PWA Wave World 2nd Place, six-time Indoor World Champion.
 Josh Angulo (USA): Mark's younger brother and early pioneer of Cape Verde.
 Tonky Frans (BON): 3rd world freestyle 2009. 1st Midwinters Merit Island Freestyle Competition in 2001.
 Jean-Patrick van der Wolde (NED): IFCA Junior World Champion of 2011.
 Mike Waltz (USA): first to put a windsurfing sail on a surfboard and sail the famed Hookipa beach on Maui in 1979. Mike also hosted Maui's first professional wave sailing and slalom event in 1981, which became the foundation of the windsurfing world tour, and Maui became the mecca for the sport both as a design center and a training ground for professionals.
 Dave Kalama (USA): Although known for his big wave surfing and stand-up surfing accomplishments, he is an outstanding windsurfer and invented the move known as the Goiter.
 Matt Schweitzer(USA): First World Champion (1974), and winner of 18 World Championship level events in subsequent years.
 Josh Stone (USA): freestyle pioneer, inventor of the Spock, PWA Freestyle World Champion in 1999, 2000.
 Ricardo Campello (VEN): a freestyle innovator, he created many difficult moves, PWA Freestyle World Champion in 2003, 2004, and 2005.
 Kauli Seadi (BRA): pioneered freestyle maneuvers in wave competition. Ranked first in PWA Wave competition in 2005, 2007, 2008.
 Gollito Estredo (VEN): 9 time PWA Freestyle World Champion 2005, 2006, 2008, 2009, 2010, 2014, 2015, 2017, 2018, innovator of many new freestyle tricks.
 Thomas Traversa (FRA): PWA Wave World Champion 2014, 1st RedBull Storm Chase.
 Steven van Broeckhoven(NED): European Freestyle Champion 2010, PWA Freestyle World Champion 2011.
 Philip Köster (GER): PWA Wave World Champion 2011, 2012, 2015, and 2019.
 Víctor Fernández (ESP): PWA Wave World Champion 2010, 2016, and 2018.
 Marcilio Browne (BRA): IWT BIG WAVE Most Radical All Time Champion 2020, PWA Wave World Champion 2013, PWA Freestyle World Champion 2008.
 Boujmaa Guilloul (MOR): 1st PWA event Hawaii Pro wave 2004, 2014 1st AWT Pro Fleet - Starboard Severne Aloha Classic, 9th PWA Starboard Severne Aloha Classic, 2010 ranked 20th overall PWA Wave, 2009 8th Cabo Verde Wave, 2008 ranked 19th overall PWA Wave, 2007 ranked 14th Wave, came 5th in Guincho. 1st Aloha Classic 2014, 2nd IWT Wave Overall Pro Men 2015, 1st IWT Wave Overall Pro Men 2016.
 Camille Juban (GDE): IWT BIG WAVE All-Time BIGGEST WAVE RIDER Champion 2020 (video), 2 x Aloha Classic Champion 2011 and 2018. 3 time AWT overall Pro Men Wavesailing champion 2012, 2013 and 2015.
 Bernd Roediger (USA): 2 times Aloha Classic Champion 2012 (youngest ever winner at 16 years old), 2013.
 Frank Ervin: Formula windsurfing lightweight world champion.
 Morgan Noireaux (USA): 3 times Aloha Classic Champion 2014, 2015, 2017. IWT overall Pro Men Wavesailing champion 2017.
 Antoine Martin (GDE): Aloha Classic Champion 2019, 2 x IWT Wave Champion 2018, 2019, French National Wave Champion 2019.
Robby Swift (GB)  Competing internationally in the PWA World Tour as a wave/freestyle sailor. He was the Youth World Champion, in Racing and Slalom 2000.

Top women
 Jill Boyer (USA): World Wave Champion 1984.
 Julie de Werd (USA): World Wave Champion 1984.
 Clare Seeger (GBR): One of the top female windsurfers in the 1980s. She was also No 1 British Champion for 10yrs and was the first Briton to obtain and overall World Title. Clare won numerous events around the World until finally settling in Hawaii. She was one of the first women who did forward loops, push loops and was the first person to do a double back loop at Ho'okipa,Maui, Hawaii.
 Lisa Penfield (USA): Freestyle World Champion 1985, multiple Championships from 1981– 1986.
 Dana Dawes (USA): World Wave Champion 1986, 1987.
 Nathalie Siebel (FRA): World Wave Champion 1986, 1988, 1990, 1992, 1994.
 Angela Cocheran (USA): World Wave Champion 1989, 1991.
 Natalie Lelievre (FRA): overall World Champion, 1984, 1985. World Wave Champion 1995, 1996, 1997.
 Barbara Kendall (NZ): 3 time Olympian representing New Zealand with Gold in Barcelona 1992, Silver in Atlanta 1996, Bronze in Sydney 2000.
 Jessica Crisp (AUS): 5 time Olympian representing Australia. PWA Overall World Champion 1994. PWA World Wavesailing Champion 1993.
 Karin Jaggi (SUI): multiple PWA World Champion in freestyle, wave, speed competition, 1990s and 2000s. World Wave Champion 1998.
Daida Ruano Moreno (ESP): PWA Wave World Champion, 2000, 2001, 2002, 2003, 2004, 2005, 2008, 2009, 2010, 2011, 2013. Freestyle World Champion 2003–2006. The Most dominant female athlete in the history of wavesailing.
Iballa Ruano Moreno (ESP): PWA Wave World Champion, 1999, 2006, 2007, 2012, 2014, 2015, 2016, 2017, 2018. Twin sister of Daida Moreno.
 Sarah-Quita Offringa (ARU): 17-time World Champion (12 Freestyle, 4 Slalom & 1 Wave), PWA World Wave Champion 2019, 2 x Aloha Classic Wave Champion 2016, 2019.
 Sarah Hauser (NCL): IWT BIG WAVE All-Time BIGGEST WAVE RIDER Champion 2020 (photo), 2 x Aloha Classic Wave Champion 2017, 2018, 3 x IWT Wave Champion 2015, 2016, 2018.

Related water sports
Other watersport variants using a board and wind power include Kiteboarding and Wingsurfing.

Kiteboarding uses a large kite (around 9 to 20qsm) on 20+m lines for wind power. Due to the strong possible upward lift, smaller boards with no significant buoyancy are used.

Wingsurfing or wing foiling uses a hand-held wing, a smaller version of a kite, to replace the sail. To offset the low wind power resulting from the comparatively small wing size (around 3 to 9 sqm), a Foilboard can be used.

Windfoiling mounts in the fin box a hydrofoil which lifts the board off the water and improves speeds due to reduced drag.

See also

Kite ice skating — ice skater propelled by kite
Land sailing — yacht with wheels
Land windsurfing — on large skateboard, propelled by sail
Wakeboarding — water skiing on a board instead of skis
Waterskiing

References

External links

Official Formula Class Website
 Continentseven, international windsurfing website 
 WindsurfingMag Windsurfing Magazine
 FollowTheWinds, international windsurfing news website
 International Windsurfing Association

 
American inventions
Sailboat types
Surfing
Boardsports
Articles containing video clips